Trick is the second solo album by Kele Okereke, the lead singer of British indie rock band Bloc Party. It was released on 13 October 2014 through Lilac Records. It entered the UK Albums Chart at number 99.

Track listing

Notes
 "First Impressions" features vocals by Yasmin.
 "Closer" features vocals by Jodie Scantlebury.

Chart performance

References

2014 albums
Kele Okereke albums
Albums produced by XXXChange